Reggio di Calabria Centrale railway station (Italian: Stazione di Reggio Calabria Centrale, Reggio Calabria Centrale or Reggio di Calabria Centrale)  is the main railway station of the Italian city of Reggio Calabria in Calabria. It is the most important station of its region and is owned by the Ferrovie dello Stato, the national rail company of Italy.

History
The station was opened on 3 June 1866, as southern terminal of the first track of the Ionian Railway to Catanzaro, Crotone, Sybaris and Taranto. In 1881 it was linked to the port with a link from Reggio Lido to Reggio Marittima, the port station. The northern track to Villa San Giovanni, linking the station to the Battipaglia–Reggio di Calabria railway, was completed in 1884.

On 15 July 1970 the station was occupied by demonstrators in the first days of Reggio revolt.

Train services
The station is served by the following service(s):

High speed services (Frecciargento) Rome - Naples - Salerno - Lamezia Terme - Reggio di Calabria
Milan-Reggio di Calabria
Intercity services Rome - Naples - Salerno - Lamezia Terme - Reggio di Calabria
Intercity services Taranto - Sibari - Crotone - Catanzaro Lido - Roccella Jonica - Reggio Calabria
Regional services (Treno regionale) Cantanzaro Lido - Roccella Jonica - Melito di Porto Salvo - Reggio Calabria
Metropolitan services (Treno regionale) Rosarno - Villa San Giovanni - Reggio Calabria - Melito di Porto Salvo

Structure and transport
The new station building, projected following the modern criteria of the futurist architect Angiolo Mazzoni, was inaugurated on 18 April 1938. It counts a single floor and is located in front of the sea coast.

The station, electrified, is served by several regional trains and by a suburban rail connecting all the 10 stations of the city, from Villa San Giovanni to Melito di Porto Salvo. For long-distance transport it counts some InterCity, Express and EuroStar trains to Rome, Turin, Milan, Venice, Bari and Bolzano, linking it also with Genoa, Naples, Bologna, Florence, Pisa, Verona and other cities. Periodically it counts on direct connections to Udine and Trieste. Reggio Centrale has not international relations and direct trains to Sicily (connected with the near station of Villa San Giovanni); and all the high-speed trains (EuroStar) provide to link it with Rome on the line via Lamezia, Salerno and Naples.

Photogallery

See also
Reggio Calabria Lido railway station
Reggio Calabria Suburban Railway
List of railway stations in Calabria
Rail transport in Italy
History of rail transport in Italy

Notes and references

External links

Railway stations in Calabria
Centrale Railway Station
Railway stations opened in 1866
1866 establishments in Italy
Railway stations in Italy opened in the 19th century